Julie Benko (born March 24, 1989) is an American actress. Benko is known for her portrayal as the alternate Fanny Brice in the Broadway revival of Funny Girl (2022).

Early life and education 
Benko was born on March 24, 1989.  When she was three years old, her family moved to Fairfield, Connecticut. She attended Fairfield Ludlowe High School, in Fairfield, Connecticut. When Benko was 14, she was cast as Hodel in the musical Fiddler on the Roof which was her first theatre production, organized at a local Jewish Community Center in Bridgeport, Connecticut. Her parents and sister were also cast. In 2007, she portrayed Lizzie in Baby, alongside her father at the Curtain Call Theater in Stamford, Connecticut. Benko graduated from New York University's Tisch School of the Arts in 2013 and 2021 with a Bachelor of Fine Arts in Drama and a Master of Fine Arts in Acting, respectively.

Career 
Benko first began her professional acting career in 2008 when she understudied five roles in the national tour of Spring Awakening. She later joined the 25th anniversary tour of Les Misérables as an ensemble member and the understudy of Cosette, ultimately taking over the role of Cosette full time. Benko has also played multiple Off-Broadway and regional roles, such as Girl in Once and Emily Webb in Our Town. From 2015 to 2016, she was the understudy of both Hodel and Chava and covered six other roles in the Broadway production of Fiddler on the Roof. In 2017, she won the gold medal at the national American Traditions Vocal Competition in Savannah, Georgia. 

Benko released her debut jazz album Introducing Julie Benko on October 20, 2017, which includes "Tomorrow Is A Day For You," a song celebrating the legalization of same-sex marriage in the landmark case Obergefell v. Hodges.

Benko made her debut as a director and writer for the short film The Newlywed's Guide to Physical Intimacy in 2020, which is about a Hasidic Jewish couple on their wedding night. The film received honorable mentions and awards from the New Faces New Voices Audience Choice Award and the Online New England Film Festival Award.

Benko standby for the role of Fanny Brice in the 2022 Broadway revival of Funny Girl, with her first performance on April 29, 2022. Starting on August 2, 2022, she became a replacement for Beanie Feldstein following her leave from the show, and became Fanny Brice alternate on September 6, 2022 once Lea Michele took over the role. Her performance was met with positive reviews, with The New York Times naming her as the "2022 Breakout Star" for Theatre. She was listed as one of Crain's New York Business "2022 40 Under 40", and The New York Sun called her "[t]he Fanny Brice of our time."

Benko released the song "Start With a Bang" on February 13, 2023, written by Dan Mertzlufft and Kate Leonard with accompaniment by the Broadway Sinfonietta. In the episode "The Many Saints of Springfield" in The Simpsons, Benko's name was mentioned on a car.

Personal life 
Benko is Jewish. Benko met musician Jason Yeager at a Starbucks in 2013, and they got married in 2021. The pair released an album named Hand in Hand in 2022.

Theatre credits

Filmography

Discography 

 Introducing Julie Benko (2017)
 Hand in Hand (with Jason Yeager, 2022)

References

External links 

 
 
 
 

1989 births
Living people
Actresses from Connecticut
21st-century American Jews
21st-century American actresses
21st-century American singers
American musical theatre actresses
American LGBT rights activists
American women jazz singers
Tisch School of the Arts alumni
Actors from Fairfield, Connecticut
Jewish American actresses